Sena is a Bantu language spoken in the four provinces of central Mozambique (Zambezi valley): Tete, Sofala, Zambezia and Manica. There were an estimated 900,000 native Sena speakers in Mozambique in 1997, with at least 1.5 million if including those who speak it as a second language. It is one of the Nyasa languages.

Sena is spoken in several dialects, of which Rue (also called Barwe or Cibalke) and Podzo are divergent. The Sena of Malawi may be a distinct language. Barwe (Chibarwe) has official recognition in Zimbabwe.

Some remarks on Sena tenses can be found in Funnell (2004), Barnes & Funnell (2005) and in Kiso (2012).

Phonology

Vowels

Consonants 

 Labialized sounds  can also be heard as retroflex  among different speakers.

References

 
Nyasa languages
Languages of Mozambique